Cyclodorippoida is a group of crabs, ranked as a section. It contains the single superfamily Cyclodorippoidea, which holds three families, Cyclodorippidae, Cymonomidae and Phyllotymolinidae.

Below is a cladogram showing Cyclodorippoida's placement within Brachyura:

References

Crabs